Jeannette Eyerly (June 7, 1908 – August 18, 2008) was a writer of young adult fiction for girls and a columnist.  She was a pioneer in dealing with controversial topics in novels for young people.   Among the themes that appeared in her books were teenage pregnancy, alcohol abuse, and drug use.  She penned eighteen novels, starting with More Than a Summer Love in 1962, though she had published many short stories before that.  Her 1977 novel, He's My Baby, Now was the basis for an ABC television movie.  She also wrote two books of verse.

Born Jeannette Hyde in Topeka, Kansas to Robert Cornelius Hyde and Mabel Jeannette Young, she married Frank Eyerly in 1932. Eyerly earned a bachelor's degree in English from the University of Iowa in 1930. Her papers are archived at the University of Iowa.

Bibliography

More Than a Summer Love (1962)
Drop-Out (1963)
Gretchen's Hill (1965)
A Girl Like Me (1966)
The Girl Inside (1968)
Escape from Nowhere (1969)
Radigan Cares (1970)
The Phaedra Complex (1971)
Bonnie Jo, Go Home (1973)
Good-Bye to Budapest (1974)
The Leonardo Touch (1976)
He's My Baby, Now (1977)
See Dave Run (1978)
If I Loved You Wednesday (1980)
Seth and Me and Rebel Make Three (1983)
Angel Baker, Thief (1984)
The Seeing Summer (1984)
Someone to Love Me (1987)
Writing Young Adult Novels (1988)
Alphabet Book for Adults (2000)
Food for Thought (2003)
Jeannette Eyerly wrote 21 books or short stories. She was an excellent writer and author.

Awards

 Iowa Author Award from the Public Library of Des Moines Foundation, 2002.
 Iowa Women's Hall of Fame, 2006.

References

External links

 New York Times obituary
 http://www.lib.uiowa.edu/spec-coll/msc/tomsc600/msc599/eyerly.htm .
 http://www.desmoinesregister.com/apps/pbcs.dll/article?AID=/20080823/OPINION01/808230303/1036/Opinion
 School Library Journal obituary

1908 births
2008 deaths
American centenarians
20th-century American novelists
University of Iowa alumni
American women short story writers
American young adult novelists
Writers from Topeka, Kansas
American columnists
21st-century American novelists
American women novelists
American women columnists
20th-century American women writers
21st-century American women writers
Women writers of young adult literature
American children's writers
20th-century American short story writers
21st-century American short story writers
American women non-fiction writers
20th-century American non-fiction writers
21st-century American non-fiction writers
Women centenarians